Bodokro is a town in central Ivory Coast. It is a sub-prefecture and commune of Béoumi Department in Gbêkê Region, Vallée du Bandama District.

Villages
The 48 villages of the sub-prefecture of Béoumi and their population in 2014 are:

Notes

Sub-prefectures of Gbêkê
Communes of Gbêkê